Events from the year 1955 in Jordan.

Incumbents
Monarch: Hussein 
Prime Minister:
 until 30 May: Tawfik Abu al-Huda 
 30 May-15 December: Sa`id al-Mufti
 15 December-21 December: Hazza' al-Majali 
 starting 21 December: Ibrahim Hashem

Events
 November-December: a fresh wave of riots oust the government and police crush uprising.

Establishments

 American Community School in Amman.

See also

 Years in Iraq
 Years in Syria
 Years in Saudi Arabia

References

 
1950s in Jordan
Jordan
Jordan
Years of the 20th century in Jordan